Łukasz Maszczyk (born 15 December 1984 in Myszków) is a Polish amateur boxer who has qualified for the 2008 Olympics at Light-Flyweight.

Career
At the World Championships 2007 Maszczyk lost in the opening rounds to Georgiy Chygayev. He later qualified for the Olympics by beating Belarusian boxer Anton Bekish in the semi final of a European qualifying tournament.

Professional record

|-
|align="center" colspan=8|5 fights, 4 wins (3 knockouts), 1 losses (0 knockouts), 0 draw
|-
|align=center style="border-style: none none solid solid; background: #e3e3e3"|Result
|align=center style="border-style: none none solid solid; background: #e3e3e3"|Record
|align=center style="border-style: none none solid solid; background: #e3e3e3"|Opponent
|align=center style="border-style: none none solid solid; background: #e3e3e3"|Type
|align=center style="border-style: none none solid solid; background: #e3e3e3"|Round, time
|align=center style="border-style: none none solid solid; background: #e3e3e3"|Date
|align=center style="border-style: none none solid solid; background: #e3e3e3"|Location
|align=center style="border-style: none none solid solid; background: #e3e3e3"|Notes
|- align=center
|Loss
|4-1
|align=left| Krzysztof Cieślak
|
|
|
|align=left|
|align=left|
|- align=center
|Win
|4-0
|align=left| Andras Varga
| 
|
|
|align=left|
|align=left|
|- align=center
|Win
|3-0
|align=left| Oszkar Fiko
|
|
|
|align=left|
|align=left|
|-align=center
|Win
|2-0
|align=left| Artsem Abmiotka
|
|
|
|align=left|
|align=left|
|-align=center
|Win
|1-0
|align=left| Piotr Filipkowski
| 
| 
|
|align=left|
|align=left|
|-align=center

External links
 Olympic qualifier at amateur-boxing.strefa.pl
 AIBA results for Olympic qualification.
 
 
 
 

Olympic boxers of Poland
Boxers at the 2008 Summer Olympics
1984 births
Light-flyweight boxers
Living people
People from Myszków
Sportspeople from Silesian Voivodeship
Polish male boxers
21st-century Polish people
20th-century Polish people